László Radocsay (18 November 1878 - 14 November 1968) was a Hungarian politician and jurist, who served as Minister of Justice between 1939 and 1944.

References
 Magyar Életrajzi Lexikon

1878 births
1968 deaths
People from Sečanj
People from the Kingdom of Hungary
Unity Party (Hungary) politicians
Justice ministers of Hungary
Members of the National Assembly of Hungary (1939–1944)
Austro-Hungarian military personnel of World War I